The 1980 GP Ouest-France was the 44th edition of the GP Ouest-France cycle race and was held on 26 August 1980. The race started and finished in Plouay. The race was won by Patrick Friou of the Miko–Mercier team.

General classification

References

1980
1980 in road cycling
1980 in French sport
August 1980 sports events in Europe